Nottawasaga Pines Secondary School, also known as NPSS, is a public secondary school in Angus, Ontario. The principal is Kelly Lalonde. It opened in September 2011, and currently has curriculum for Grades 9–12. The school is part of the Simcoe County District School Board. The school serves secondary school students from Essa Township, Base Borden, Community of Angus, Tosorontio and a portion of Clearview Township.

Academics and classes
Nottawasaga Pines Secondary School offers a full range of courses for success in all three pathways: University, College, and Workplace.

Some available courses include:
Math
Science (Biology, Chemistry, Environmental Science, Physics, Health Science)
English
French
History (American History, History Before The 19th Century)
Geography (Environment and Resource Management, Travel & Tourism)
Co-operative Education (2 Credit and 4 Credit programs)
Career Studies
Parenting
Fashion
Fitness & Gym
Leadership & Peer Support
Law
Hospitality & Tourism
Food & Nutrition
Construction
Media Arts
Theatrical Arts
Drama
Dance
Visual Arts
Communication Technology
Manufacturing Technology
Automotive Technology
Custom Woodworking
Cosmetology
Instrumental Music
Design
All courses offered by Nottawasaga Pines Secondary School can be found on the school's course calendar.

Facilities
Nottawasaga Pines Secondary School was designed by Snyder Architects and completed in October 2011 by Percon Construction for the Simcoe County District School Board. The school was opened with 600 students, and is located on the outskirts of Angus, on Simcoe County Road 10. The school has three floors and many eco-friendly features (including solar panels). Athletic facilities include a large gymnasium, exercise room, as well as an outdoor gravel running track.  Other features include a large parking area (shared with the neighbouring arena and ice rink), and a medium-sized soccer/football/rugby field. The school also has a large number of windows to produce natural light inside the building.

Feeder schools
Elementary Feeder Schools within the Simcoe County District School Board as follows:
Angus Morrison ES
Baxter Central PS   
Pine River ES   
New Lowell PS
Tosorontio Central PS

Student activities
Nottawasaga Pines Secondary School currently offers many clubs and activities, including:
Production Crew
Link Crew
Drama Club & Sears Festival
Global Action
B.O.B. (Bunch of Believers, weekly meetings about religion and devotion)
Dance Team
Concert Band
Student Council
Student Investment 
Peer Tutoring
Dance

as well as various sports teams, including hockey, rugby, soccer, flag football, cross country, badminton, track and field, volleyball, basketball, football, cross country, etc.

Community use of the school
Nottawasaga Pines currently is accommodating the Essa Library Angus Branch which the school shares with Essa Township. Because of this partnership, students have the opportunity to come in at any time during the day and use it much like a normal school library. Since the school and the public library both have ownership, the library has increased materials, and a larger facility. The local Ontario Provincial Police detachment is also found within the same building, although it does have its own separate entrance.

See also
List of high schools in Ontario

References

External links
Nottawasaga Pines Secondary School
Snyder Architects

High schools in Simcoe County
Educational institutions established in 2011
2011 establishments in Ontario